Longsword by the Irish writer Thomas Leland, is a medieval romance 
based on the life of William Longespée, 3rd Earl of Salisbury, the son of Henry II. Published in 1762, in 1767 it was adapted into a play The Countess of Salisbury.

Longsword contains "...mystery, dark dungeons, shipwrecks, abducted damsels, evil monks, and heartless villains", Although titled Longsword, Earl of Salisbury: An Historical Romance, Albert Power views it as the "cornerstone" of the Irish Gothic novel as well.

References

Bibliography
 Donald F. Bond & George, Sherburn. The Literary History of England: Vol 3: The Restoration and Eighteenth Century (1660-1789). Routledge, 2003.

1762 novels
18th-century Irish novels
Novels set in England
Novels set in the 13th century
Historical novels
Irish novels adapted into plays